The Stored Waste Examination Pilot Plant (SWEPP) is a facility at the Idaho National Laboratory for nondestructively examining containers of radioactive waste to determine if they meet criteria to be stored at the Waste Isolation Pilot Plant. SWEPP is part of the Radioactive Waste Management Complex, located southwest of EBR-I.

External links
 Radioactive Waste Management Complex at the Idaho National Laboratory

Industrial buildings and structures in Idaho
Radioactive waste
Nuclear technology in the United States